A cherry-red spot is a finding in the macula of the eye in a variety of lipid storage disorders and in central retinal artery occlusion.
It describes the appearance of a small circular choroid shape as seen through the fovea centralis.
  Its appearance is due to a relative transparency of the macula; storage disorders cause the accumulation of storage material within the cell layers of the retina, however, the macula, which is relatively devoid of cellular layers, does not build up this material, and thus allows the eye to see through the macula to the red choroid below.

The sign was first described by Warren Tay, founding member of the British Ophthalmological Society, in 1881, with reference to a patient with Tay–Sachs disease.

The cherry red spot is seen in central retinal artery occlusion, appearing several hours after the blockage of the retinal artery occurs.  The cherry red spot is seen because the macula receives its blood supply from the choroid, supplied by the long and short posterior ciliary arteries, while the surrounding retina is pale due to retinal artery infarction. It is also seen in several other conditions, classically Tay–Sachs disease, but also in Niemann–Pick disease, Sandhoff disease, and mucolipidosis.

Differential diagnosis of cherry-red spot at macula

Metabolic Storage Diseases:,
Tay–Sachs disease
Farber disease 
GM1 and GM2 gangliosidoses
Metachromatic leukodystrophy
Niemann–Pick disease 
Sandhoff disease 
Sialidosis 
Congenital developmental diseases (e.g., Leber's congenital amaurosis)
Hereditary/ Familial:
Pantothenate kinase-associated neurodegeneration
Vascular (e.g., central retinal artery occlusion)
Drugs:
Quinine toxicity
Dapsone toxicity 
Poisoning:
Carbon monoxide
Methanol
Blunt ocular trauma

See also
Lipid storage disease

References

Medical signs
Ophthalmology